Henry Hugglemonster is a computer animated preschool television series produced by Brown Bag Films. The show is designed for children aged 2–7. It is based on the 2005 book I'm a Happy Hugglewug written and illustrated by Niamh Sharkey. The series premiered on Disney Junior in the United Kingdom on February 8, 2013 and in the United States on April 15. It aired in 2015 on the afternoon Disney Junior segment on Disney Channel in United States and Canada. It ended on November 30, 2015.

Premise
The series revolves around the daily life of a yellow monster named Henry Hugglemonster and his family, living in a village called Roarsville. Other places characters come from include Growlsberg and Growltown. Henry has a best friend named Denzel Dugglemonster and a monsterette friend named Gertie Growlerstein. Henry's experiences with his family and friends often lead to trouble, so Henry must use his problem-solving skills to find a way to resolve the conflicts he is presented with in his daily life. This gives him the opportunity to learn valuable lessons every day. Every episode features one or more original songs.

Common Sense Media stated that many of the episodes include "basic preschool skills like counting and sequences".

Episodes

Characters

The characters in the series are primarily monsters and their pets (called Monsterpets).

The Hugglemonster family
 Henry Alfonzo Hugglemonster (voiced by Lara Jill Miller in the US and voiced by Teresa Gallagher in the UK) is  5-year-old, yellow monster whose horns resemble those of a jester's cap. He never backs down from a problem, because he believes he, his family, and his friends can "always find a way." His favorite sport is huggleball, which is similar to soccer, except that it is legal to carry the ball into the goal, and the ball sticks to the monsters' skin. He is energetic, and is able to do a one-hand hang with his left for at least 40 seconds. He often says "Roarsome!" and his family motto is, "Hugglemonsters always find a way!"
 Summer Hugglemonster (voiced by Hynden Walch) is Henry's 7-year-old sister. She has pink skin and usually wears red shoes. Her hobbies include putting on plays, singing, dancing, writing, composing music, and cheerleading. She is flexible enough to do a left front split. She is also called Summerling but it is unclear if this is her full forename or a nickname. Her friends include Izzy and Meg.
 Cobby Hugglemonster (voiced by Chiara Zanni) is Henry's 8 year old brother. He has cyan blue skin,  and Henry calls him Cobster. He is an inventor, and his inventions sometimes come in handy in solving problems. Some of his inventions include monster bots, and an Astrobix spaceship models. He is the tallest sibling in the family.
 Ivor Hugglemonster (voiced by Kari Wahlgren) is the baby of the family, who is now one year old, but cannot yet talk or fly.
 Daddo Hugglemonster (voiced by Tom Kenny in the US and Lewis MacLeod in the UK) is a green monster mailman who can be a bit forgetful at times. His talent is a form of juggling called huggle-juggling, which he often does when making the family's famous dinner. He is the son of Nan-Oh and Grando, and he is married to Momma. He is the father of Cobby, Summer, Henry and Ivor. He is also a scoutmaster assisted by Eduardo Enormonster.
 Grando Hugglemonster (voiced by Tom Kenny in the US and Ben Whitehead in the UK) is the husband of Nan-Oh, father of Daddo, and paternal grandfather of Cobby, Summer, Henry and Ivor.
 Swifty Hugglemonster is the grandfather of Grando, the great-grandfather of Daddo, the great-great-grandfather of Cobby, Summer, Henry, and Ivor, and former mayor of Roarsville, depicted on an old coin.
 Momma Hugglemonster (voiced by Lori Alan in the US and Morwenna Banks in the UK) is a pink monsterette and a talented musician who plays multiple instruments. She teaches monster kids piano lessons. She is the wife of Daddo and the mother of Cobby, Summer, Henry and Ivor.
 Nan-Oh Hugglemonster (voiced by Grey DeLisle in the US and Jen Pringle in the UK) is the wife of Grando, mother of Daddo and paternal grandmother of Cobby, Summer, Henry, and Ivor.
 Beckett Hugglemonster is the Hugglemonster family's pet monster dog who is male and orange.
 Harry Hugglemonster (voiced by Jessica DiCicco) is Henry's cousin who has four arms and red skin. He once visited the Hugglemonsters in Thanksgiving, and started to cause some trouble. It is not clear which of his parents is a sibling of one of Henry's. 
 Dexter Hugglemonster (voiced by Tom Kenny) is Henry's uncle and Harry's dad. Dexter is also Daddo's older brother.
 Dee Hugglemonster (voiced by Jessica DiCicco) is Henry's aunt and Harry's mom.

The Dugglemonster family
 Denzel Dugglemonster (voiced by Cree Summer) is Henry's 7-year-old best friend (and Henry is his best friend as well). He has a passion for digging tunnels. He is white skinned, and has a brown ring around his right eye. His catchphrase is "Grr-ocious!" He appears fearful and anxious at times but always looks up to Henry whenever trouble occurs in the town. When he feels frightened, he would hastily dig a hole and hide there until his friends tell him it's okay. This usually happens when he mistakes something for a scary figure or an actual scary figure appears in front of him. It is possible that he might have a case of post-traumatic stress (or post-roarmatic stress). He is an only-child in his family. He was the drummer of Roar Direction, a parody of the popular boy band, One Direction, formed by Henry and Summer.
 Herold Dugglemonster (voiced by Rob Paulsen) is the father of Denzel who works as a baker. He has the same skin colors as Denzel.
 Maude Dugglemonster (voiced by Cree Summer) is the mother of Denzel and the wife of Herold. She has the same skin colors as Herold and Denzel.
 Grammo Dugglemonster (voiced by Cree Summer) is the grandmonster of Denzel, who was one of the rapping grandmas in "Knit-O-Bot". It is still unknown if she has mothered Maude or Herold.
 Gurgler Dugglemonster is the Dugglemonster's blue pet monster dog.
Denzel 3000 (voiced by Cree Summer) was a robot that resembled Denzel Dugglemonster, in which Cobby had invented as a request from Henry after he and Denzel fought over two comic books.

The Growlerstein family
 Gertie Growlerstein (voiced by Grey Griffin) is Henry's intelligent monsterette friend with orange skin and yellow little swirls around her body. She wears a watch on her left wrist and claims to never make mistakes. She is able to do a one-armed straddle planche on her right hand Henry refers to her as his pal.
 Milo Growlerstein (voiced by Hynden Walch) is Gertie's little brother. He looks similar (in terms of skin color), except he has two light blue horns, including another horn in the middle of his head that is curved to the left, light blue polka dots around his body, and bigger pupils. Milo feels that he is too young for anything than an older monster can do, yet he idolizes Henry as a big brother because he seems to always be there when he needs it. Due to his light nature, throughout the second season, he is the victim of having been thrown in the air by anything—be it a waterslide, seesaw, and even ribbons—and being caught by his best friends. He enjoys playing with toys, for example, an orange/red minuscule tractor-trailer despite automobiles almost do not exist in the series.
 Gregor Growlerstein (voiced by Tom Kenny) is the father of Gertie and Milo who works as a comic book vendor.
 Joyce Growlerstein (voiced by Hynden Walch) is the loving mother of Gertie and Milo.
 Sneezo Growlerstein is the Growlerstein's female pet monster bird who sneezes often, hence the given name. She is mostly allergic to monsterflowers.

The Enormomonster family
collectively referred to in the show as "the Enormos".
 Estelle Enormomonster (voiced by Grey Griffin in the US and Chaniya Mahon in the UK) is a gentle giant who has purple skin, she's Henry's large, energetic, and optimistic friend. She appears much taller than Henry, in spite of being younger than him, not turning 5 years old until the second season. She also knows how to play the harp.
 Eduardo Enormomonster (voiced by Brian Blessed) is Estelle and Hugo's dad. He serves as assistant scoutmaster to Daddo, and he also has an older brother even bigger than he is.
 Ernestine Enormomonster (aka Mrs. Enormomonster) (voiced by Brenda Blethyn) is Estelle and Hugo's mother and the wife of Eduardo.
 Hugo Enormonster is Estelle's baby brother. He has navy blue skin and resembles his dad's head when he was a baby.
 Josh Enormomonster is Estelle and Hugo's uncle and the older brother of Eduardo. He has red skin with yellow and green stripes in his belly and yellow horns with green polka dots on his head.
 Flopster Enormomonster is Estelle's purple monster dog, who is larger than the other monsterpets.

The Snifflemonster family
 Izzy Snifflemonster (voiced by Kari Wahlgren) is a yellow-purple monsterette that who is one of Summer's friends. She has six purple horns on her head. She has sneezing issues and sounds as if she has allergies (hence the name Snifflemonster), similar to Sneezo. She owns a pearl necklace that she wears all the time in all her appearances. She once has slept over at her place with Meg. She also has competed with Summer in singing. She is the only monsterette sibling in the family.
 Roberto Snifflemonster (voiced by Grey Griffin) is a teal monster that has four horns (two horns on each side) and a darker teal stripe around his belly. He is one of Henry's closest friends and is slightly shorter than him. He also speaks with a Hispanic/Italian accent, unlike other monsters who speak with a regular accent. It was mentioned that he has a grandmonster, but may not be clear if she is also the grandmonster for the other Snifflemonster siblings. Despite other monsters appearing with large fangs, Roberto's fangs are much shorter. He once copied Henry's race car before the Roaring Racers competition. He is the fourth member of the Monster Scouts.
 Oscar Snifflemonster (voiced by Cree Summer) is a tall green monster, that has three yellow triangular horns with green stripes on it, and a yellow stripe around his body. He also has freckles like other monsters, except Henry. He is friends with Cobby and Gertie. Unlike Denzel and Cobby, he sounds like that of a teenager, making him possibly the oldest monsterkid in town. He and Cobby have an interest in Astrobix, and he designed his own astrobix model, which is red and has triple turbo boosters. He once was Cobby's partner in the Roar-plane Racing competition.
Roy (voiced by Grey Griffin) and Kelly Snifflemonster (voiced by Hynden Walch) are two short yellow monster twins that only have one fang, like Ivor and Hugo, and are one of Henry and Milo's friends.

The Blobbymonster family
 Fergus Blobbymonster is Henry's friend who does not speak, but only babbles and gargles. He has light blue skin with pink polka dots around his body.
 Fergal Blobbymonster is Fergus's dad, who has darker skin than him. Just like Fergus, he never speaks, but babbles. In an episode, he and Fergus are eating ice cream when he accidentally dropped his on Fergus’ head.

Recurring
Forename and surname known
Roddy Cloudmonster (voiced by Tara Strong) is Henry's mean red friend who can produce clouds using his breath, in which they can be used to hover around. He is a red monster with a blue oval on his torso, along with a very long and spiky tail. He sometimes laughs, “rah-hah!” with excitement or as a part of teasing a monster, mainly Henry and his friends.
Meg Munderclaw (voiced by Grey Griffin) is a light green monsterette with four yellow stripes in her body and two long purple horns in two sides of her head. She is Summer's friend that attended her sleepover at her house with Izzy. After her pets and Henry's pets became romantically involved, Henry brought her a rose in his mouth (which she ate) and then Henry salsa stomped, tossed and dipped her and she ditched Summer and Izzy to go be alone with Henry in his room, suggesting that she might have a crush on Henry. 
 Matilda Munderclaw (voiced by Grey Griffin) also nicknamed Tilda, is a monsterette photographer. She has green and yellow stripes in her body. She later marries Signor Roartonio. Spelled Matilde in some TV listings.
Shakey Munderclaw  is Meg's female purple pet monster dog who has bells on her ears. She and Beckett once kissed while eating spaghetti together like in Lady and the Tramp.
Hildegard Howoooolermonster (voiced by Grey Griffin) nicknamed "Hildy" to all her "Best Brain Buddies", is a tall glasses-wearing green skinned monsterette (Cobby calls her a "monster girl" in his song though) student who demonstrated a volcano that makes donuts at the science fair. She thinks Henry is "smart-a-rooni" but it is actually Cobby feeding him words. Cobby has a crush on her. She is the tallest monster kid Henry has known, taller than Oscar.
Isabella Roarson (voiced by Geri Halliwell) is Summer's pop star idol. Summer claims to be her "number one fan" who had printed hundreds of copies of her autograph.
 Selena Songmonster is the camp counselor of Rock N’ Roar Music Camp. She is blue-skinned with lighter blue stripes in her belly, wears pink lipstick, and has two blue horns resembling long hair. In one episode, she praised Izzy over Summer during their overconfident competition, and picked her to sing in the Spotlight Solo.
Mimi Monstermouth (voiced by Joan Rivers) is a wisecracking and talented pastry chef and a daycare teacher known for baking cakes, pies, and other desserts, who knows all about babies She is purple-skinned and has blonde hair, whom may be the only monster known to have hair.
Santa Claws is a chubby elderly monster who comes every Hugglemas, giving toys and gifts to good monsters and monsterettes. His name and personality is an ultimate reference to Santa Claus.

Surname known
 Mr. Growl (voiced by Tim Whitnall) is a judge from Grr Factor (which is a parody of The X Factor) who once visited the Hugglemonsters. He is light blue-skinned and has purple and blue zigzags on his torso.
 Mrs. Growlburg or Growlberg is a blue monsterette who works in the elementary school. She is Henry's teacher.
 Officer Higgins (voiced by Tom Kenny) is a light blue skinned monster who is the town's only patrol officer. He speaks in a Southern accent and a good friend to Henry.
 Mayor Roariani (voiced by Tara Strong) is a three-eyed blue monsterette who is the mayor of Roarsville. Prior to her was Swifty Hugglemonster. She once left Henry in charge upon realizing she had an emergency meeting in Growlsburg. 
Signor Roartonio (voiced by Tom Kenny) is a blue monster who is the owner of an Italian restaurant in Roarsville. He uses phrases from the Italian language and makes Italian cuisine. He was then married to Matilda.
 Mr. Winklemonster (voiced by Tom Kenny) is an indigo monster who sells toys in Roarsville. He wears a green bowler hat and glasses.
The Operator (voiced by Rob Paulsen) is a big blue monster with red and cyan horns on his head and red and cyan stripes in his belly. He wears a red hat.

Forename known
Hollander aka Captain Hollander (voiced by Rob Paulsen) is an airship pilot. He is blue striped skinned and has a green oval in his torso. He is hard of hearing and tends to mishear what others say to him. He speaks and sings in a tenor voice. He claims that his name is not Jerry and that he loves ducks.
Max is Milo's friend, whom was only mentioned by Gertie.
Eva is Max's sister. She once said she saw a Sno-Grr in Mount Roarsome.
 Irving (voiced by Grey Griffin) is the owner of the Pet Palace and once a bike shop in Roarsville. He has a round yellow belly, striped red and yellow horns and has a yellow nose He is also a talented musician who can play many instruments. He is often referred to as "Irv".
 Mini-Monsters are blue puffy puffball-like pets that bounce and make squeaky sounds; they have no mouth, big eyes, and green/blue striped horns on their heads. They were purchased by the Hugglemonster kids as a gift for Momma.
Three-Eyed Rhett (voiced by Diedrich Bader) is a yellow monster whom was a new classmate that Henry guides in Monsterschool. He is even larger than Estelle, and as his name suggests, he has three eyes. He wears a cowboy hat which he is shy about taking off because he doesn't have any horns. The hat itself has fake horns coming out of it.
The Mighty Roarhammer (voiced by Tom Kenny) is a superhero from a comic that Henry and his friends love to read. They once thought of their own comic that continues from the previous issue, which ended with a cliffhanger. His name is a reference to The Mighty Thor.
Captain Stomper is Henry's superhero alter-ego (or, sometimes, a superhero that looks exactly like Henry), who appeared in two episodes. In his first appearance, he wore a red mask, red gloves, and blue boots. A hammer is shown on his torso in replace of the ordinary blue and green stripes. Later, he wore a red mask, red gloves, blue suit, blue underwear, blue giant boots, and a red cape. Captain Stomper's superpower is self-explanatory considering his surname: stomping. Doing said power can cause a brief earthquake that can shatter everything in its path when impacted by the shockwave.
Grrocious Diggity Monster(also known as Super Diggity) is Denzel's superhero alter-ego, and is the first of Captain Stomper's three superhero sidekicks. He wears a dark blue mask, gloves, underwear (but it is only mentioned), belt, and boots. His superpower is drilling through tunnels with his hands, similar to his major life interest. This power can also be used for dodging any incoming attack.
The Tick-Tockster is Gertie's superhero alter-ego, and is the second member of Captain Stomper's sidekicks. Her costume is a working clock, which her hands resemble the hands you see in an actual clock. Her superpower is forwarding or reversing time, making enemies around her dizzy or floored.
Excito-Monster is Estelle's superhero alter-ego and is the third and final member of Captain Stomper's sidekicks. Her superpower is strength. She is attired in a yellow face mask, gloves, blue mask, and dark red boots.
Princess Pirouette is Summer's princess alter-ego who wore a blue hat, blue skirt with a yellow star, and pink shoes. The main villain of this made-up comic trapped her inside a sealed cage before having saved in time by both Captain Stomper and The Mighty Roarhammer.
 Sonic Growl is a rock group who performed one of their greatest hits "Follow Your Monsterdream" with the Hugglemonster family. The members of the group are:
Shred (lead guitar, voiced by Jess Harnell)
Fred (bass guitar, voiced by Rob Paulsen)
Ted (drums, voiced by Tom Kenny)

Other monsters

Ben (voiced by Cree Summer) is one of the first background monsterkids in the series. He is a purple monster with an orange oval on torso, along with five yellow circles, and orange/yellow striped horns on his head. He had two alternative voices: one sounding like an average teenager, and the other in a Southern style accent. In spite of being a background character in the show, he has only said one line.  He is seen to have known many major characters like Denzel, Izzy, and Oscar.
 Stanley is another of the many background monsterkids in the series. He is an orange monster who has blue horns on his head and blue polka dots around his body. His monsterly appearance is also similar to that of a dinosaur and lizard (he has the second longest tail prior to Roddy, round spikes ranging from his back to the edge of his tail, and a muzzle-shaped mouth). The style of his head can be used in the “Monster Maker” activity game, as well as his horns. He is shown to be close friends with Ben and Oscar. He resembles Denzel as his fangs stick out on the bottom of his mouth and has giant hands.
Kayla (voiced by Grey Griffin) is another one of the many background monsterkids in the series. She is a light green monsterette with pink and blue stripes on her belly and pink horns on her head. She is once seen wearing a tutu, indicating that her interest is ballet and dancing. 
Tommy (voiced by Hynden Walch) is a playful little indigo monster who resembles Milo. He speaks in a very high-pitched voice. He appeared in one major scene: he mistakenly thanked Henry for bringing his ball back down from atop a jungle gym, when it was actually Roddy who brought his ball down.

Locations
Roarsville is the main setting of the show; a small valley in the middle of nowhere where monsters and monsterettes live.
Growlsburg is a town where the Hugglemonsters visited to see the reunion concert of Sonic Growl.
Growltown is another town where Three Eyed Rhett moved from. It is believed to be a town where scary monsters live, according to Roddy.
Rainbow Falls is a river where monsters and monsterettes can go fishing, boating, and other activities. It includes a few mountains, a waterfall, and a rainbow in the background. The myth of the Spooky River Monster takes place here, which had Denzel frightened at first before realizing it never existed.
The Roarsville Bike Shop is a small shop owned by Irving. This is Cobby's first job location, to help sell his new invention, The Cobby Comfort Cruiser.
The Roarsville Bakery is a pastry shop where Denzel's father works. The building resembles a pink cupcake with magenta polka dots around it, a red cherry on top, and another cupcake designed as a second story with windows.
The Roarsville Café is an Italian restaurant owned by Signor Roartonio (and the only restaurant known in Roarsville) where monsters can order usually basic Italian cuisines such as pizza, spaghetti, and cannolis. Cobby's second job was at this location.
Hugglemonster Towers is believed to be the city hall of Roarsville. This is where the mayor makes her announcements to the public. A giant orange clock is shown on top of the tower. In one episode, an aluminum rain pipe was included for Henry to grasp and cling onto as the wind almost blew him off the building—while attempting to rescue the monsterpets from an airship that took off without its pilot.
Monsterschool is an elementary school all the monsterkids attend. The science fair takes place here.
Mount Roarsmore is a snow-covered mountain located miles from Roarsville. Henry and his friends had visited there a few times to play in the snow.
Roarsville's Monster Wave Park is a water park at Roarsville, where Henry and his friends go swimming. It has a giant water slide designed as a green-striped dragon's long tongue, a bridge, and a pool that generates large waves for surfing.
The Glimmergrove is a fairy-tale municipal where Henry and his mother stumbled upon after a magical bird feather touched the ground, causing the mother and son to wind up here.
The Monster Moon is a fictional astronomical body the Hugglemonster house landed after Henry accidentally blasted the family and Denzel into outer space during Cobby's Huggleween party. They were able to survive without visible protection on the Monster Moon, which had no apparent atmosphere, suggesting that monsters and monsterettes can resist the vacuum of outer space and, if they have to breathe or are required to hold their breath, they can hold their breath for extended periods of time. While driving across craters and peeking inside them in search of Beckett, Denzel and Henry get abducted by real giant aliens as they were mistaken for two shorter aliens that completely resembled their Halloween costumes.
Rock N’ Roar Music Camp is a summer camp where young monsters and monsterettes go to have fun, play music, and more importantly, cherish music in their hearts. The campsite contains a pond with several brass-playing canoes (called “music-canoes”), four red cabins, a giant trampoline designed as a drum set, a sing-along gathering, and a stage where one monster—with the most music in his/her heart—can perform a song solo at night, known as the Spotlight Solo.
The Monster Scare Fair is an amusement park Henry and his classmates visited for their field trip. Denzel was not fond of it due to the frightening images among him.

The Airship takes monsters to the following locations above. It is a red blimp, except the balloon is much smaller than the gondola. Unlike most modern blimps, this airship has a metal rudder connected behind the back window, similar to a boat. Captain Hollander pilots the airship, and is one of the very few transportation methods in Roarsville besides bikes, canoes, and skateboards.

Home media
Home media is distributed by Walt Disney Studios Home Entertainment.

References

External links
 Official site
 Official UK site
 
 

Disney Junior original programming
2010s American animated television series
2013 American television series debuts
2015 American television series endings
2013 Irish television series debuts
2015 Irish television series endings
American children's animated fantasy television series
American children's animated musical television series
American computer-animated television series
Irish children's animated fantasy television series
Irish preschool education television series
American preschool education television series
Animated preschool education television series
2010s preschool education television series
English-language television shows
Disney animated television series
American television shows based on children's books
Television series by Brown Bag Films
Television series by Disney
Animated television series about children
Animated television series about monsters